Montpellier's Corum is a building that houses both a conference centre and an opera house (Opéra Berlioz), and is located in the centre of the city in southern France.

It was designed by Claude Vasconi and opened to the public in 1988. The building forms the visual closing of the Esplanade seen from the Place de la Comédie. It is covered in slabs of pink marble. The high costs of the building were subject of political debate in the 1980s, mostly directed against then-mayor Georges Frêche.

The Conference Center has 6000 m² of exhibition space. The Opéra Berlioz, named after Hector Berlioz, seats 2000 persons, and since 1990 has been one of the performance venues for the Opéra National de Montpellier.

References

External links 

 Enjoy Montpellier, the management company of the Corum

Buildings and structures in Montpellier
Hector Berlioz
Tourist attractions in Montpellier